Hasan Rıza Pasha (1871 – 30 January 1913) was a general in the Ottoman Army.

Life
The son of the distinguished Ottoman statesman Mehmed Namık Pasha, who was the Governor of Baghdad where Hasan Riza was born. He was of Turkish origin, as Mehmed Namık's grandfather migrated from Konya to Constantinople. He entered the Ottoman Military Academy in 1892 and graduated on March 13, 1895. He continued his studies in Germany (1899–1900). After serving in Iraq (1901–-1911) he was promoted to the rank of General and assigned as wali of Shkodër.

He was the main commander during the Siege of Shkodër and became the symbol of resistance against the Serbian and Montenegrin invasion. He did his utmost to defend the town and its fortress that were under siege by Montenegrin and Serbian forces for seven months, stating "Shkodra is our fate or our grave, but not our shame". However, in the midst of the siege, Hasan Riza Pasha was assassinated by agents of Essad Pasha. 

Edith Durham wrote that after Hasan Riza had supper with Essad, he was shot dead a few yards away from the house by two men disguised as women. Osman Bali and Mehmed Kavaja, both servants of Essad Pasha, boasted afterwards that they had done the deed. The town crier proclaimed that nothing was to be said about the murder, and Essad now took command.

Riza Pasha wanted to keep up the defense of the besieged city but Essad Pasha wanted to continue his secret negotiations with Montenegro, which were done through the counsel of Russia in Shkodra. Essad Pasha's plan was to hand over Shkodra to the Serbs and Montenegrins as the price for their support in his attempt to proclaim himself King of Albania. Essad Pasha handed Shkodra over to General Vukotić.

Legacy
Hasan Riza Pasha is well remembered in Shkodër. He was buried at Parrucë Mosque.

A Turkish-Albanian college in Shkodër bears his name. He got decorated for "First Class Bravery" in August 1996, by Albanian President Sali Berisha. and a monument was erected in his honor in 2007.

References

1871 births
1913 deaths
People from Baghdad
Ottoman Army generals
Ottoman Military Academy alumni
Ottoman Military College alumni
Ottoman military personnel of the Balkan Wars
Assassinated people from the Ottoman Empire
Deaths by firearm in Albania